The 2017–18 season is Swindon Town's 139th season in their existence, and first season back in EFL League Two following relegation from EFL League One. The season covers the period from 1 July 2017 through to 30 June 2018.

Players

First Team Squad

Transfers

In

Out

Loans in

Loans out

Pre-season
As of 20 July 2017, Swindon Town have announced six pre-season fixtures against Melksham Town, Swindon Supermarine, Oldham Athletic, Woking, Salisbury and Chippenham Town.  On Tuesday 18 July 2017 Swindon Town travelled to Faro, Portugal for a week long pre-season training camp.  The warm weather pre-season tour included a behind closed doors training ground friendly against Bristol Rovers which ended 0–0.

Competitions

Overview

{| class="wikitable" style="text-align: center"
|-
!rowspan=2|Competition
!colspan=8|Record
|-
!
!
!
!
!
!
!
!
|-
| League Two

|-
| FA Cup

|-
| EFL Cup

|-
| EFL Trophy

|-
! Total

League Two

League table

Results summary

Results by matchday

Matches

The fixtures for the 2017–18 season were announced on 21 June 2017 at 9am.

FA Cup

EFL Cup

On 16 June 2017, Swindon Town were drawn away to Norwich City in the first round.

EFL Trophy

Group stage
On 12 July 2017, Swindon Town were drawn alongside Bristol Rovers, West Ham United and Wycombe Wanderers in Southern Group C.

Knockout stage

Statistics

Appearances

Top scorers
The list is sorted by shirt number when total goals are equal.

Clean sheets
The list is sorted by shirt number when total appearances are equal.

Summary

Awards

Player

References

Swindon Town F.C. seasons
Swindon Town